No More Secrets may refer to:

No More Secrets, 1994 novel by Lilian Darcy
No More Secrets, 1995 novel by Linda Randall Wisdom
No More Secrets for Me, child abuse prevention book for children by Jane Aaron
No More Secrets, 1996 film by Loretta Todd
No More Secrets, 1999 film by Sylvia Hamilton
No More Secrets, a 2003 album by Instrumental Quarter
"No More Secrets", song by Papa Roach from The Paramour Sessions
"No More Secrets", song by Hed PE from Truth Rising 2010
"No More Secrets", song by Carolina Liar from Wild Blessed Freedom 2011